The College Area is a residential community in the Mid-City region of San Diego, California, United States. The College Area is dominated by San Diego State University (SDSU; once known as San Diego State College), after which the area is named. Several neighborhoods in the College Area were developed in the 1930s, with others becoming established in the post-war period. The College Area is bordered on the west by Kensington and Talmadge and on the east by the city of La Mesa. El Cajon Boulevard is a busy shopping district; additional retail, entertainment and dining establishments are located in a new housing and commercial complex known as South Campus Plaza on College Avenue at Aztec Center.
The College Area includes the neighborhoods of the Catoctin Area, Dennstedt Point, East Falls View Drive, Saranac-Mohawk, and an Orthodox Jewish neighborhood in the area near Congregation Beth Jacob Orthodox Synagogue on College Avenue.  The region includes Alvarado Hospital, a 306-bed acute care facility, and the College-Rolando branch of the San Diego Public Library.

History 
On August 18, 1948, the "Campus Drive-In" movie theater with a capacity for 900 cars was built at the intersection of College Avenue and El Cajon Boulevard. The opening night films were Give My Regards to Broadway and The Kansan. The final two features in 1983 were The Dark Crystal and Dragonslayer.

In 1961, snack-bar employee Tom O'Leary was convicted of manslaughter for stabbing a patron named Dennis O'Connor to death at the drive-in. The O'Connor family sued the company for wrongful death but did not prevail. The dead man's family became active in city politics and eventually his sister Maureen O'Connor was elected mayor of San Diego in 1986.

Three neon drum majorettes wearing Indian headdresses from the Drive-In are preserved in the Vons shopping center at this location and one large one is preserved in the College Grove Shopping Center in Rolando Park.

Geography
The College Area lies on a plateau known as Montezuma Mesa which overlooks Interstate 8. The neighborhood's borders are defined by Montezuma Road/Collwood Boulevard to the southwest, Interstate 8 to the north, 73rd Street to the east, and El Cajon Boulevard to the south.  A large canyon opens up in the center of the SDSU campus known as Aztec Bowl and descends toward Alvarado Creek in Mission Valley.   Canyon Crest Drive snakes down through the canyon from 55th Street to College Avenue.

Transportation
MTS (Metropolitan Transit System) operates the San Diego Trolley to SDSU Transit Center and the Alvarado Medical Center trolley station, both of which are in the College Area. The trolley station at SDSU, as well as a bus plaza, make up the SDSU Transit Center. Bus routes 11, 11A, 14, 936, and Rapid Bus 215 go to the Transit Center, to name a few. Transfers are made from the SDSU trolley subway station located at the Transit Center, underneath the bus plaza. Riders can go up to the bus plaza via elevator or stairs.

As of October 12, 2014, the SDSU Transit Station serves as the starting point for MTS Rapid Bus Route 215.  A high-frequency, limited-stop service runs between San Diego State University and Downtown San Diego via El Cajon Boulevard and Park Boulevard. This route provides a convenient transit option for visitors and nearby neighbors from downtown San Diego, North Park and Hillcrest to shop and dine in the busy commercial corridor.

Traffic
The College Area is accessible from Interstate 8, State Route 94.  Surface streets entering into the College Area include 70th Street (accessible from I-8), College Avenue (accessible from I-8 and SR94) and 54th Street and Montezuma Road (accessible from I-8). Built in July 2005 there is also a mass transit connection by MTS San Diego Trolley accessing the SDSU on-campus underground station. Traffic can be high during the day however, local residents and City officials working together to increase pedestrian and bicycle routes and modifying the street infrastructure to eleviate any congestion in the area as the population grows in the neighborhoods.

Education
The College Area is home to one traditional elementary school, one private K-8 school, two alternative K-8 schools, and SDSU.

Elementary schools
 Hardy (San Diego Unified School District)

K through 8
Blessed Sacrament Parish School

K through 12
San Diego Unified School District
 Language Academy
 Tubman Village Charter

Colleges and universities
 San Diego State University
Platt College

References

External links

 City Council District 9 Neighborhood: College Area
 College Area Community Council
 Alvarado Estates
 College View Estates
Rolando Community Council
 Rolando Village, located in San Diego's College Area, 92115
  San Diego State University
 The Daily Aztec, community newspaper
 College Area Business District

Neighborhoods in San Diego
Urban communities in San Diego
College Area (neighborhood)